SSX on Tour is a snowboarding and skiing game, the fourth title in the SSX series of video games for the GameCube, PlayStation 2, Xbox and PlayStation Portable. It was released in North America on October 11, 2005 and in the PAL region on October 21, 2005. The PlayStation Portable version was released in Europe on October 28, 2005. In 2007, a prequel titled SSX Blur was released, which took place between SSX 3 and SSX on Tour. The GameCube version contains Mario, Luigi, and Princess Peach as playable characters. This was part of a deal Nintendo had with EA Sports to have Nintendo's intellectual properties appear in EA franchises.

Gameplay
The gameplay in SSX on Tour is similar to that in SSX 3, with similar controls and the overall aims of events remaining the same - snowboard down a mountain while gaining points for various tricks that can be performed. After each trick, a player's "boost bar" builds up, and once full enables a player to perform special moves (which have been renamed from "Über Tricks" to "Monster Tricks"). Despite the similarities, numerous changes were made to the structure of races and events themselves. A new mechanic in On Tour compared to previous entries is the addition of skiing alongside snowboarding, though the gameplay of the two is fairly identical. Players can now create their own characters, selecting his/her symbol, makeup, height, clothes and hair, in addition to whether they are a snowboarder or a skier. Once created, their character can compete in official competitions (known as "Events"), or unofficial challenges known as "Shreds". Each completed event or challenge gains their character "Hype", raising their profile and moving them up the SSX charts, with the ultimate goal of reaching number one.

With the focus now on custom-created characters, the original SSX cast is moved into the background slightly, appearing in various Shreds against the player, and available to play as when not on the Tour itself. In addition to seven returning SSX veterans (Elise, Mac, Kaori, Zoe, Psymon, Nate and Allegra), three new characters make an appearance: Tyson, Sid and Skye. In the Nintendo GameCube version, Mario, Luigi, and Princess Peach appear as playable characters, and the level "Last Call" was renamed to "Nintendo Village", with Mario-themed iconography replacing certain textures in the level. Unlike its predecessor, SSX3, no online play was included on any of the versions of SSX On Tour. The main focus was on improving the single-player story mode, implementing the character-creation system, working on new levels, and implementing skiing.

The PSP version also differs greatly from the main console versions, with limited customization to custom-characters and levels borrowed from SSX 3. It also has omitted the use of bonuses when doing Monster Tricks.

This game is presented in the style of a sketch-book, a new direction for the SSX series. The cover artwork as well as the in-game menus are all shown in sketch formats, simplistic images often on a lined background. The special in game collectibles, displayed as snowflakes in previous SSX games, have been replaced with sketchlike doodles known as "skulvis", which were actually controversial within the team according to art director Rich Curren. "When we looked at the SSX franchise, everything was shiny and slick and felt too 'produced,'" said Curren. "We used drawings that looked like they were produced by a 15-year-old kid – not even 'good' drawings at that. We committed to this concept and it worked."

Soundtrack
Like SSX Tricky and SSX 3, SSX on Tour features a licensed soundtrack, this time with more prominence on rap, punk, rock, and alternative music styles. The focus of punk and rock is a departure from the more electronic hip-hop, breakbeat, and techno focused soundtracks of previous games in the series. According to art director Rich Curren, the goal of this change was to capture "something that was more reflective of snowboard and youth culture at the time: the second coming of rock." He recalled the move was initially met with "a lot of blank stares" but after initial tests proved the music was getting the highest reception of anything in the game, they ran with the new direction. 

Tracks used on the menu screens are instrumental versions of the ones used during races. Much like previous entries, the soundtrack dynamically fades out when you do certain actions, such as using your boost meter or getting big air off a jump. In addition, when performing "Monster Tricks" during an event, the music will fade away, to be replaced with the sound of the wind whistling as the player cuts through the air. Upon hitting the ground again, the music cuts back in. The main song used in the intro is Iron Maiden's Run to the Hills.

Reception

The game received "favorable" reviews on all platforms according to video game review aggregator Metacritic. In Japan, Famitsu gave the GameCube and PS2 versions a score of one nine and three eights, bringing it to a total of 33 out of 40; for the PSP version, the same magazine gave it a score of three eights and one seven, while Famitsu Cube + Advance also gave the GameCube version three eights and one seven, both for a total of 31 out of 40.

Awards and nominations
Awards
Alternative Sports Game at IGN
Best Use of Sound in a Game at DEM X AWARDS 2005
D.I.C.E's Best Sports Game of the Year Academy of Interactive Arts & Sciences (AIAS) 2006

Nominations
Best Mobile Game of the Year CAEAA 2006
Best Individual Sports Game at Spike Video Game Awards 2005
Best Sports/Extreme Sports title at 1UP.com

References

External links

2005 video games
GameCube games
EA Sports games
EA Sports Big games
Interactive Achievement Award winners
Multiplayer and single-player video games
PlayStation 2 games
PlayStation Portable games
Skiing video games
SSX
Video games developed in Canada
Xbox games
D.I.C.E. Award for Sports Game of the Year winners